The 2018 season was Kaya F.C.–Iloilo's 2nd season in the Philippines Football League (PFL), the top flight of Philippine football. In addition to the PFL, the club also competed in the Copa Paulino Alcantara.

On 6 February 2018, the club formerly known as Kaya F.C.–Makati moved from Makati to Iloilo City. They changed their name accordingly to Kaya F.C.–Iloilo. They finished second in the PFL and won the inaugural Copa Paulino Alcantara, earning qualification to the 2019 AFC Cup.

Pre-season and friendlies

Friendlies

Prior to February 6, 2018. The club was known as Kaya FC–Makati.

Competitions

Overview

Philippines Football League

Results summary

Results by round

Matches

Notes:
 a  Due to the unavailability of Iloilo Sports Complex, the match was played in their previous "home" venue, the University of Makati Stadium.
 b  Due to the unavailability of Marikina Sports Complex, the match was played in a neutral venue, the Biñan Football Stadium.
 c  Due to the unavailability of Cebu City Sports Complex, the match was played in a neutral venue, the Biñan Football Stadium.
 d  Originally scheduled on 2 May, the match was postponed to 1 June. Global Cebu eventually forfeited the match. Kaya-Iloilo won 3–0 by default.
 e  Due to the unavailability of Davao del Norte Sports Complex the match was played in a neutral venue, the Rizal Memorial Stadium.

Copa Paulino Alcantara

Group stage

Notes:
 a  Due to the unavailability of Iloilo Sports Complex, the match was played in neutral venue Rizal Memorial Stadium.
 b  Due to the unavailability of Cebu City Sports Complex, the match was played in neutral venue Rizal Memorial Stadium.
 c  Due to the unavailability of Marikina Sports Complex, the match was played in neutral venue PFF National Training Centre.

Knockout stage

Final

Squad

Pre-season transfer

In

Out

References

Kaya FC–Iloilo 2018
Kaya FC–Iloilo 2018